Brenda Cullerton (born April 11, 1952) is an American author, fashion writer and creative consultant. Her first novel, The Craigslist Murders, was published by Melville International Crime in 2011. Inspired by her experience furnishing an entire house from finds on the List, the book is currently held in more than 240 libraries.

Early life and education

Cullerton was born in Norwalk, Connecticut. She received an Associate degree from Bard College at Simon's Rock, and finished her BA degree in English literature at New York University.

Career
Cullerton began her career as a copywriter at Grey Advertising and continued to work as a freelance concept and content strategist for brands including Vogue, Donna Karan, Eileen Fisher, Aveda, Bergdorf Goodman, and others.

Cullerton has written editorials, mostly in the area of fashion and design, and is the author of six books. Her memoir, The Nearly Departed or My Family & Other Foreigners, was published by Little Brown in 2003. She wrote a biography of American fashion designer, Geoffrey Beene,  and this was followed by several books on interiors and the home, all published by Harry Abrams.

Cullerton's one-woman-show, Jay Z and Me: A fast talking memoir,  debuted at the Solo Voce Estrogenious festival in New York City on October 13, 2013. It was later performed at The Edinburgh Fringe Festival, The Merchant House in Amsterdam and various other New York venues.

Personal
Brenda Cullerton lives and works in New York City with her husband, Richard DeLigter, a television director and the founder of Real Productions, Inc. She has two children.

Works

Nonfiction

My Family & Other Foreigners (2003) 
Geoffrey Beene: The Anatomy of his Work] (1995)
 Time at Home (2001)
Color at Home (2008)
The Nearly Departed: Or, My Family and Other Foreigners (2003)

Fiction

The Craigslist Murders (2011)

References

External links 

Brenda Cullerton's website
NYC Interview with Brenda Cullerton 

1952 births
Living people
American women writers
Bard College alumni
New York University alumni
21st-century American women